Na'amod (Hebrew: נעמוד) is a movement of British Jews seeking to end the British Jewish community's support for the Israeli occupation of the West Bank, East Jerusalem and Gaza Strip. They state their aim as  "to work for freedom, equality and justice for all Palestinians and Israelis". Members are active in many parts of the country including London, Bristol, Manchester, Leicester, Leeds and Newcastle. They estimate they have over 250 members.

History

Na'amod means 'We Will Stand' in Hebrew, and is taken from the liturgy used to call Jews up to a Torah reading during synagogue services. Na'amod was founded in May 2018 in response to the IDF shooting of Gazans in the Gaza Border Protests of that year. A group of 50 Jewish activists protested the shootings by holding a mourning service in Parliament Square, including reciting the Mourner's Kaddish, a Jewish prayer for the dead. This was highly controversial within the Jewish community and the ensuing criticism led some of the activists present to establish what would become Na'amod. They drew inspiration from similar movements elsewhere, such as IfNotNow in The United States, which had also recited the Mourner's Kaddish in public to mourn Palestinians and Israelis killed in the 2014 Israel-Gaza conflict outside the offices of the Conference of Presidents of Major American Jewish Organizations. Na'amod's first action took place in Luton airport in July 2018, where activists approached members of a UJIA Birthright trip with leaflets about alternative narratives, to counter what they argue are the one-sided briefings that British Jews receive on Birthright tours of Israel. Raphi Bloom, Co-chair of North West Friends of Israel, commented, "their attempt to besmirch UJIA is simply malicious".

In 2022, David Collier, a British Jewish blogger on antisemitism, reported that Na'amod had offered to help Pete Gregson, a leftwing activist who had been expelled from both GMB and the Labour Party for Holocaust denial, arrange a UK speaking tour. Na'mod initially made a public statement that Collier's allegations were meritless and referred to him as an "extreme right-winger" who was smearing their group due to their support for Palestinian rights. When Collier released emails that confirmed the contacts between Na'amod and Gregson, the group stated that while an initial investigation had turned up no evidence of any such interactions, they would conduct a follow-up review on the matter. Na'amod eventually confirmed the Gregson contacts, stating that the unnamed individual who made them had been dismissed from their ranks to "gardening leave", and apologized to Collier while making a small donation to a UK peace organization.

Structure and activities 

Na'amod is a decentralised non-hierarchical organisation which is made up of six teams which manage different aspects of the organisation. Members make decisions by consensus, and the movement sets policy at quarterly "Big Meetings" and annual Strategy Retreats. In between these, a body called the Strategy Leadership Team meets to oversee the movement and provide strategic direction. Membership is restricted to those who identify as Jewish. 

Na'amod has campaigned against plans to annex the West Bank, UK Lawyers for Israel when they hosted a representative of settler group Regavim, the appointment of Tzipi Hotovely as Israeli ambassador to the United Kingdom, the Israeli bombing of Gaza in 2021 and the evictions in Sheikh Jarrah in East Jerusalem.

Reception 

Arielle Angel, editor of US magazine Jewish Currents, sees Na'amod as one of a number of groups in the US and U.K. who have "moved the intra-communal conversation around Israel/Palestine". In January 2022 they were featured in a BBC documentary about antisemitism and the Jewish community.

The Jewish Chronicle has dismissed Na'amod as "a fringe left-wing group" and "a minor Jewish anti-occupation group" However, Keith Kahn-Harris, a sociologist and commentator on British Jewish affairs has described Na'amod as having an "influence disproportionate to their size" with activists who are "deeply engaged in Jewish life". Na'amod has over ten thousand followers on Twitter and several thousands on both Instagram and Facebook.

See also 

 Israel lobby in the United Kingdom - List of British groups which seek to influence UK foreign policy on behalf of the state of Israel or Zionism
 Yachad (UK) - Jewish NGO based in London promoting a two state solution
 IfNotNow - United States Jewish anti-occupation group
 Jewdas - London-based radical left Jewish diaspora group which also opposes the occupation
 Jewish Socialists' Group - British Jewish social group which supports anti-Zionism

External links 
Official Website

References 

2018 establishments in the United Kingdom
Jewish organisations based in the United Kingdom
Jewish anti-occupation groups